SS Athos was a French cargo-passenger ship of the Messageries Maritimes, launched in 1914, that was sunk in the Mediterranean by the German submarine  during World War I.

Ship history
Construction of the ship started on 25 July 1914 in Dunkirk, but was halted when the city was bombed during the First Battle of Ypres. The ship was towed to Saint Nazaire, where it was completed as a troopship and not, as intended, as a passenger ship.

Her first voyage was to China, leaving on 28 November 1915. Her second was between 29 October and 26 December 1916 from Marseille to Yokohama and back.

Aboard Athos were 1,950 people, including the crew, Chinese Labour Corps, a large continent of Senegalese Tirailleurs soldiers, and civilian passengers, including women and children. The ship sank in 14 minutes taking with her 754 people, including the captain and 11 crew members. The survivors were picked up by the escort ships Enseigne Henry and Mameluck, as well as the gunboat Moqueuse and the torpedo-boat Baliste.

References

External links 
 Technical data of the Athos 
  
 Pictures of the Athos
 The Athos on Frenchlines.com 
 Blog-Discussion on the Athos

1914 ships
Ships built in France
World War I passenger ships of France
World War I shipwrecks in the Mediterranean Sea
Maritime incidents in 1917
Ships sunk by German submarines in World War I